Piotr Pawlicki (born 30 November 1994) is a Polish speedway rider.

Career
Born in Leszno, he is the son of former rider Piotr Pawlicki Sr. and the younger brother of Przemysław Pawlicki. He won the Polish Under-21 Championship in 2011 and also competed in the World Under-21 Championship. He rode for his hometown team Unia Leszno in the Speedway Ekstraliga and also for Piła in the Polish second division. In August 2011 he was signed by Coventry Bees and rode for them in the Elite League. He was a reserve at the 2011 Polish Grand Prix at Torun. His 2011 season was ended by a broken wrist sustained while racing in Poland in October.

In 2012 he rode for Poole Pirates as a temporary replacement for the injured Dennis Andersson, coming in on an assessed average of 4.00. Poole wanted him to return in 2013 but decided against signing him after he was given a higher assessed average of 7.00 by the BSPA's independent arbitrator.
On 4 October 2014, he was crowned as the 2014 U21-Worldchampion in Pardubice, leading the Junior Worldchampionship after three Events in Lonigo, Ostrow and Pardubice. For 2015 he has been nominated as one of the three Speedway-GP Reserves for the SGP 2015.

In 2023, he signed for Piraterna in the Swedish Elitserien (he first rode for the club in 2011).

Speedway Grand Prix Career
In 2016 and 2017, he competed in the Speedway Grand Prix wearing the number 777. In 2016 Pawlicki was on the main roster and raced in 11 Grand Prix's, 18 heat wins, and made one Grand Prix final.

Speedway World Cup Career
Piotr has competed in both 2016 and 2017 World Cup's. In the 2016 semi final Pawlicki was the top scorer for team Poland. For the final in Great Britain the current captain Maciej Janowski was dropped and young Piotr, at only 21, was the new captain. He raced Poland to victory beating Great Britain for the title. In 2017 he was back on the Polish team alongside fellow grand prix riders: Captain Maciej Janowski, Bartosz Zmarzlik, and Patryk Dudek. Where they won and were back to back champions beating team Sweden in Lezno, Poland.

References

1994 births
Living people
Polish speedway riders
Unia Leszno riders
Coventry Bees riders
Poole Pirates riders
People from Leszno
Sportspeople from Greater Poland Voivodeship